The following is a list of original programs of TV Barrandov network.

Series 
 Bastardi
 Bezdružice
 Cyranův ostrov
 Čechovi
 Doktorka Kellerová
 Noha 22
 Odsouzené
 Ona a On
 Premiér
 Profesionálové
 Rodinné vztahy
 Soudce Alexandr
 Soudkyně Barbara
 Sousedé
 Stopy života

News 
 Krimi zprávy
 Moje zprávy
 Naše zprávy
 VIP svět

Comedial shows 
 Vtip za stovku!

Talk show 
 Aréna Jaromíra Soukupa
 Duel Jaromíra Soukupa
 Hovory Kalousek Soukup
 INSTINKTY Jaromíra Soukupa
 Na ostří nože se Soukupem
 Na rovinu se Soukupem, realita v talk show
 Týden s prezidentem

Other shows
 Agáta Jaromíra Soukupa
 Nebezpečné vztahy

References

Barrandov